Nūhaka is a small settlement in the northern Hawke's Bay Region of New Zealand's eastern North Island, lying on State Highway 2 between Wairoa and Gisborne. The road to Mahia turns off the highway at Nūhaka.

Nūhaka has one general store, a fish and chip shop, a local garage and a paua factory. It also has a substantial and well supported meetinghouse of the Church of Jesus Christ of Latter-day Saints.

Demographics
It is part of the wider Mahia statistical area.

Nūhaka had a population of 198 at the 2018 New Zealand census, a decrease of 12 people (−5.7%) since the 2013 census, and a decrease of 48 people (−19.5%) since the 2006 census. There were 78 households, comprising 102 males and 96 females, giving a sex ratio of 1.06 males per female. The median age was 46.0 years (compared with 37.4 years nationally), with 36 people (18.2%) aged under 15 years, 36 (18.2%) aged 15 to 29, 87 (43.9%) aged 30 to 64, and 42 (21.2%) aged 65 or older.

Ethnicities were 33.3% European/Pākehā, 80.3% Māori, and 1.5% other ethnicities. People may identify with more than one ethnicity.

Although some people chose not to answer the census's question about religious affiliation, 25.8% had no religion, 63.6% were Christian, and 7.6% had Māori religious beliefs.

Of those at least 15 years old, 24 (14.8%) people had a bachelor's or higher degree, and 42 (25.9%) people had no formal qualifications. The median income was $21,500, compared with $31,800 nationally. 9 people (5.6%) earned over $70,000 compared to 17.2% nationally. The employment status of those at least 15 was that 57 (35.2%) people were employed full-time, 21 (13.0%) were part-time, and 21 (13.0%) were unemployed.

Marae

Nūhaka is the tribal centre of the Ngāti Rakaipaaka people, a Māori subtribe of Ngāti Kahungunu. It has several marae (meeting grounds) and wharenui (meeting houses) for Ngāti Rakaipaaka and other iwi (tribe) and hapū:

The master-carved Kahungunu Marae is a war memorial carved under the tutelage of Pine Taiapa. It features in the 1950s film Broken Barrier directed by John O'Shea. Since 2005, it has hosted events as part of the Wairoa Maori Film Festival. It includes Te Maara A Ngata wharenui, and is affiliated with Ngāti Pāhauwera and Ngāti Pāhauwera hapū, and Ngāti Pāhauwera iwi.

Māhanga or Rongomaiwahine marae and Te Poho o Rongomaiwahine wharenui is a marae, also affiliated with Ngāi Tū hapū.

Other marae include Tamakahu Marae, Tāne-nui-a-Rangi Marae, Te Kotahitanga and Nūhaka Unity Hall, Te Manutai Marae, and Te Poho o Te Rehu or Te Rehu Marae.

In October 2020, the Government committed $1,949,075 from the Provincial Growth Fund to upgrade Te Manutai Marae, Te Poho o Te Rehu Marae, and 22 other marae. It also committed $288,609 to upgrade Kahungunu Marae.

Education

Nuhaka School is a Year 1–8 co-educational state primary school.

References

Wairoa District
Populated places in the Hawke's Bay Region
Populated places around Hawke Bay